Nicholas Patrick Charles II (born December 16, 1982) is an American politician, first elected to the Maryland House of Delegates in 2018 to represent District 25, which includes major landmarks such as Andrew's Air Force Base and Prince George's Community College. The district is located in Prince George's County and comprises two municipalities, The City of District Heights, Maryland, the Town of Morningside, Maryland, and multiple unincorporated communities Forestville, Capitol Heights, Suitland, Largo, Kettering, Clinton, Temple Hills, Westphalia, and Upper Marlboro. He is the Chairman of the Prince George’s County House Delegation, which consists of all 23 Maryland State Delegates that represent the Districts of Prince George's County. The Prince George's County House Delegation is the 2nd largest House Delegation in the State of Maryland. Additionally, he is the Vice Chairman of the Maryland House Democratic Caucus which consists of 102 of the 141 members of the Maryland House of Delegates.

Early years
Delegate Nick Charles was born in Washington, D.C., on December 16, 1982, to Marie Beresford, a retired 30+ year United States Navy budget analyst, and Major Nicholas Charles, a decorated retired United States Army Officer. As a lifelong resident of Prince George's County, Maryland, he attended Benjamin D. Foulois Elementary School of Morningside, Maryland, in District 25, Eugene Burroughs Middle School of Accokeek, and Largo Senior High School of Upper Marlboro, Maryland, also of District 25 where he graduated.

Military service
Delegate Charles enlisted into the United States Air Force on September 4, 2001, leaving The Pentagon where he had worked as a government employee for 3 years. His Air Force Specialty Code was 1C502, an Aviation Resource Manager. While on active duty, his service with the 60th Fighter Squadron during Operation Noble Eagle for Air Patrol Missions over the Washington Metropolitan Area and Air Force One escorts, following 9/11, garnered him meritorious recognition with an Air Force Achievement Medal. His efforts in the 422nd Test and Evaluation Squadron were instrumental in the declaration of the F-22A Initial Operational Capability resulting in another presentation of the Air Force Achievement Medal. As an Air Force veteran, Delegate Charles was awarded 2 Air Force Achievement Medals for his distinguished military service.

He then enlisted into the District of Columbia Air National Guard located on Andrews Air Force Base until he received an Honorable Discharge after six years of honorable military service.

Duty Stations
Eglin Air Force Base, Florida – 60th Fighter Squadron of the 33rd Fighter Wing

Nellis Air Force Base, Nevada – 422nd Test and Evaluation Squadron of the 53rd Wing

Andrews Air Force Base, Maryland – 121st Fighter Squadron of the 113th Wing (District of Columbia Air National Guard)

Education
After graduating from Largo Senior High School, he attended Prince George's Community College prior to enlisting into the United States Air Force. He earned an associate degree in Applied Science (AAS) in Aviation Management from the Community College of the Air Force and a Bachelor of Business Administration (BBA) in Procurement and Public Contracting from the University of the District of Columbia.

Career
Delegate Charles started his career with the Department of Defense as an intern during the summer of his 11th grade year. He has over 20 years of experience providing acquisition, program management, and administrative support to the Department of Defense at various levels. He has worked ACAT Level 1 programs and Non ACAT programs working through Milestones B, C, and FRP. His work effort in the 422nd Test and Evaluation Squadron was instrumental in the declaration of the F-22A Initial Operational Capability resulting in a presentation of the Air Force Achievement Medal. While supporting the Assistant Secretary of the Navy for Research, Development, and Acquisition Chief System Engineer's Office, he was recognized as one of Naval Sea Systems Command 21st Century Leaders in the NAVSEA publication On Watch. He was additionally recognized for superior service PEO IWS 2.0 Program Manager now PEO Integrated Warfare Systems Rear Admiral Douglas Small with a Certificate of Appreciation.

In the legislature
Delegate Charles was first elected in Nov 2018 and reelected in 2022 to represent Maryland's Legislative District 25.

(2023-  ) Co-Chair of the Black Wealth Subcommittee in the Legislative Black Caucus of Maryland

(2023-  ) Vice Chairman of the Maryland House Democratic Caucus

(2022-  ) Member of the House Ways and Means Committee

(2022-  ) Member of Revenues Subcommittee

(2022-  ) Members of Gaming and Horse Racing Subcommittee

(2021- ) Chairman, Prince Georges County House Delegation 

(2019- ) Member of the Black Caucus

(2019- ) Member of the Veterans Caucus

(2019-2021) Member of the Health & Government Operations Committee (HGO)

(2019-2021) Member of Insurance and Pharmaceutical Subcommittee

(2019-2021) Member of Health Occupations and Long Term Care Subcommittee

(2019-2021) Vice Chairman of the Law Enforcement Sub-committee of the Prince George's County House Delegation

Delegate Nick Charles was unanimously elected in 2021 to finish the term of former Delegate now Maryland US Attorney Erek Barron, and reelected in 2023 to serve as the Chairman of the Prince George's County House Delegation

References

1982 births
Living people
Democratic Party members of the Maryland House of Delegates
African-American state legislators in Maryland
21st-century American politicians
United States Air Force airmen
University of the District of Columbia alumni
Politicians from Washington, D.C.
People from Largo, Maryland
Community College of the Air Force alumni
21st-century African-American politicians
20th-century African-American people
District of Columbia National Guard personnel